The 52nd Texas Legislature convened from January 9 to June 8, 1951. All members present during this session were elected in the 1950 general elections.

Sessions

Regular Session: January 9, 1951 – June 8, 1951

Party summary

Senate

House

Officers

Senate
 Lieutenant Governor: Ben Ramsey (D)
 President Pro Tempore: Pat M. Bullock (D)

House
 Speaker of the House: Reuben Senterfitt (D)

Members

Senate

Dist. 1
 Howard A. Carney (D), Atlanta

Dist. 2
 Wardlow Lane (D), Center

Dist. 3
 Ottis E. Lock (D), Lufkin

Dist. 4
 Jep Fuller (D), Port Arthur

Dist. 5
 Mrs. Neveille H. Colson (D), Navasota

Dist. 6
 James E. Taylor (D), Kerens

Dist. 7
 Warren McDonald (D), Tyler

Dist. 8
 A. Aiken, Jr. (D), Paris

Dist. 9
 Joe Carter (D), Sherman

Dist. 10
 Joe Russell (D), Royse City

Dist. 11
 George Parkhouse (D), Dallas

Dist. 12
 Crawford Martin (D), Hillsboro

Dist. 13
 Kyle Vick (D), Waco

Dist. 14
 William T. "Bill" Moore (D), Bryan

Dist. 15
 Gus J. Strauss (D), Hallettsville

Dist. 16
 Searcy Bracewell (D), Houston

Dist. 17
 Jimmy Phillips (D), Angleton

Dist. 18
 John J. Bell (D), Cuero

Dist. 19
 Rudolph A. Weinert (D), Seguin

Dist. 20
 Carlos Ashley (D), Llano

Dist. 21
 W. A. Shofner (D), Temple

Dist. 22
 Wayne Wagonseller (D), Stoneburg

Dist. 23
 George Moffett (D), Chillicothe

Dist. 24
 Pat Bullock (D), Colorado City

Dist. 25
 Dorsey B. Hardeman (D), San Angelo

Dist. 26
 Walter Tynan (D), San Antonio

Dist. 27
 Rogers Kelly (D), Edinburg

Dist. 28
 Keith Kelly (D), Fort Worth

Dist. 29
 Hill D. Hudson (D), Pecos

Dist. 30
 Kilmer B. Corbin (D), Lamesa

Dist. 31
 Grady Hazlewood (D), Amarillo

House
The House was composed of 149 Democrats and 1 Republican.  The lone Republican, Edward T. Dicker of Dallas was the first Republican elected to the Texas legislature in 20 years.  He served one term and was defeated.

House members included future Governor Dolph Briscoe, and future Congressmen Abraham Kazen and J.T. Rutherford and future Texas Attorney General Waggoner Carr.

Sources
 Legislative Reference Library of Texas,

External links

52nd Texas Legislature
1951 in Texas
1951 U.S. legislative sessions